The Year Without a Santa Claus is a 2006 made-for-television comedy family fantasy film, a live-action remake of the Rankin-Bass television special The Year Without a Santa Claus. The live-action version premiered on NBC December 11, 2006. A widescreen DVD was released on December 12, 2006.

Plot
This remake follows the same basic concept as the original: Santa, disillusioned by children's lack of belief in him and in the spirit of giving, decides not to deliver toys this Christmas Eve, despite the arguments by Mrs. Claus and two of his helper-elves, Jingle and Jangle. They decide to provide Santa with some proof that children still believe and that they still deserve toys from Santa, so the elves visit the United States in search of Christmas spirit.

They face setbacks both in South Town, which is celebrating its annual Winter Festival, and in their dealings with the jealous, competitive Miser Brothers, who refuse to compromise long enough to permit a Christmas snow in the southern town. Finally, Santa's faith in children is renewed with the help of the boy Iggy Thistlewhite.

Differences from original
The most obvious differences are in the setting, which is moved to the 21st century present day, and the music, which is all but gone. Only the iconic "Miser" songs are retained (though they are mixed together and instead of being sung when the Misers are approached, the song is sung during their feud). The brothers also have women serving them instead of the Mini Misers.

The remake also includes two subplots which do not appear in the original: The commercial coup of Santa's toy-making operation by the ambitious elf Sparky, who wants a more modern and lucrative approach; and the family troubles of Iggy. His father (here, the mayor) is too busy to focus on his family, even at Christmas. Mayor Thistlewhite is a foil both for Santa, in his journey to rediscover the Christmas spirit, and for Sparky, in his efforts to sell out the town's historic district to an out-of-town commercial enterprise. In addition, the movie attempts to give more depth to the relationship between Mrs. Claus and Santa. Another difference is that it is Santa who sees the Miser Brothers about having it snow in South Town instead of Mrs. Claus. Like in the original, the brothers refuse to cooperate, but change their minds when Santa threatens to go to their mother.

A number of pop-culture references pepper the script, including a glimpse of the original Year without a Santa Claus special on Jangle's portable TV. Faced with the prospect of losing his job because of Santa's retirement, Jangle muses that he could go to work for his cousin, who is a dentist; this refers to Hermey in Rankin-Bass' Rudolph the Red-Nosed Reindeer. The script also works in a reference to A Christmas Story: When a disgruntled man tells Santa he wanted a gun for Christmas when he was younger, Santa flatly remarks, "You would've shot your eye out, kid!" Then he comically mimics the man having (hypothetically) done just that.

Cast
 John Goodman as Santa Claus
 Delta Burke as Mrs. Claus
 Michael McKean as Snow Miser
 Harvey Fierstein as Heat Miser
 Ethan Suplee as Jingle Bells
 Eddie Griffin as Jangle Bells
 Chris Kattan as Sparky
 Dylan Minnette as Ignatius "Iggy" Thistlewhite
 Billy Slaughter as Nerd Elf

Cameos
 Carol Kane as Mother Nature
 Carson Kressley as the elf costumer
 Laura Schlessinger, "Dr. Laura", as herself
 Jack LaLanne as Hercules

Reception

Paul Mavis, for Drunk TV, wrote, "The Year Without a Santa Claus is a nauseating, angry, joyless little holiday confection sure to poison any child unlucky enough to chance upon it. This hate-filled stocking stuffer has nothing but contempt for its intended audience, promoting the worst possible beliefs about people, while cloaking itself, incredibly, in the fake guise of a meaningful lesson about the holidays: the gall that the cretinous makers of this film have is really quite audacious.”

See also
 List of Christmas films
 Santa Claus in film

References

External links

American television films
Remakes of American films
Films directed by Ron Underwood
Films scored by Deborah Lurie
Films with screenplays by Larry Wilson (screenwriter)
NBC network original films
Santa Claus in film
Santa Claus in television
The Wolper Organization films
2006 films